Azerbaijan–Nigeria relations refer to bilateral relations between Azerbaijan and Nigeria. Neither country has a resident ambassador.

Diplomatic relations 
The government of Nigeria recognized the independence of Azerbaijan on March 11, 1992.

Diplomatic relations between Azerbaijan and Nigeria were established on March 11, 1992.

On January 21–31, 2016, during the 26th meeting of the African Union in Addis Ababa, Azerbaijan's Ambassador to Nigeria Elman Abdullayev met with the Minister of Foreign Affairs of Nigeria Joffrey Onyeama. The need to create a legal framework was noted.

Economic cooperation 
In November 2009, SOCAR Trading opened a representative office in Nigeria.

In March 2019, the management of the Trading house of the State Oil Company of Azerbaijan – SOCAR Trading announced its desire to extend the contract for the export of crude oil signed with the State National Oil Corporation of Nigeria NNPC.

According to statistics, SOCAR exports approximately 1 million barrels of crude oil to Nigeria every month.

According to statistics from the United Nations Trade Office (COMTRADE), glass exports to Nigeria totaled 420 US dollars in 2017.

According to statistics from the United Nations trade office (COMTRADE), in 2018, the volume of exports of soap, wax, candles, iron and steel, mechanical equipment to Nigeria was 339 US dollars.

Starting from 2019, Azerbaijan exports fruits such as cherries, pomegranates, etc. to Nigeria.

It is planned to create an intergovernmental Commission (IPC) to expand cooperation in the economy.

Military-technical cooperation 
On February 7, 2019, Lieutenant General Ramiz Tahirov, Deputy Minister of Defense of Azerbaijan, commander of the Azerbaijani Air Force, met with a delegation led by commander of the Nigerian Air Force Sadig Baba Abubakr during his visit to Azerbaijan. Prospects for cooperation in the military sphere were discussed.

Humanitarian assistance 
In 2008, the government of Azerbaijan provided 10,000 US dollars in financial assistance to support Nigeria in its global polio eradication initiative at the World Health Organization (WHO).

On May 14–22, 2013, at the initiative of the Azerbaijan International Development Agency (AIDA), The Agency for International Cooperation under the President of Colombia, the Organization of Islamic Cooperation (OIC), and the Higher School of Petroleum of Azerbaijan, a refresher course on "Engineering and Innovation in oil refining technology" was organized. 14 experts from Colombia and a number of African countries (Nigeria, Algeria, Angola, Cameroon, Chad, Egypt, Libya, Mauritania, South Africa, Sudan) participated in the event.

In 2017, the leadership of the Azerbaijan International Development Agency provided financial assistance to the residents of Somalia, Yemen, South Sudan, and North-Eastern Nigeria in the amount of USD50,000 to prevent a cultural crisis.

The "Educational grant program for citizens of the Organization of Islamic Cooperation member countries" and "Educational grant program for citizens of the Non-aligned Movement member countries" were approved by the orders of the President of Azerbaijan on December 6, 2017, and January 10, 2018. Educational grant programs are available for undergraduate, postgraduate, doctoral, basic education, and residency programs in medical education. A total of 40 citizens from 14 countries of the Organization of Islamic Cooperation (OIC) and 15 countries of the Non-Aligned Movement (20 applicants per program) were granted the right to study at Azerbaijani universities. Currently, the citizens of Nigeria are being trained in Azerbaijan in the framework of the educational grant programs.

International cooperation 
In March 2017, at the initiative of the International Women's Organization of Nigeria, a children's charity event "Little world" was held in Lagos. The Azerbaijani side was represented by the Minister of culture of Azerbaijan, members of the diplomatic corps, journalists, etc.

See also  
 Foreign relations of Azerbaijan
 Foreign relations of Nigeria

References 

 
 

 
Nigeria
Azerbaijan